libssl is the name of a shared library file built from the code base of one of several TLS implementation projects:
 OpenSSL
 LibreSSL
 Network Security Services (NSS)